Aurat Ka Pyar is a 1933 Indian film directed by A. R. Kardar. The film was produced by the East India Film Company, in Calcutta. Kardar had moved from Lahore to Calcutta where he directed several films for the company from 1933–36, including Aurat Ka Pyar. The music composer was Mushtaq Ahmed and lyrics were by Agha Hashar Kashmiri, who also scripted the film. It starred Gul Hamid, Mukhtar Begum, Mazhar Khan, Anwari Bai, Bacha, Abdul Sattar and Athar.

The film was a commercial success at the box office and proclaimed Kardar as a "talented film-maker".

Cast 
 Gul Hamid
 Mukhtar Begum
 Anwari Bai
 Bacha
 Athar
 Mazhar Khan
 A. R. Pahelwan

Soundtrack 
One of the notable songs from this film was the classical, "Chori Kahin Khule Na Naseem-e-Bahar Ki", sung by the famous singer and actress Mukhtar Begum in Raga Darbari. The music director was Mushtaq Ahmed and the lyricist was Agha Hashar Kashmiri.

Song List

References

External links 
 

1933 films
1930s Hindi-language films
Films directed by A. R. Kardar
Indian black-and-white films